Levoketoconazole, sold under the brand name Recorlev, is a steroidogenesis inhibitor that is used for the treatment of Cushing's syndrome. Levoketoconazole was approved for medical use in the United States in December 2021.

Levoketoconazole is the levorotatory or (2S,4R) enantiomer of ketoconazole, and it is an inhibitor of the enzymes CYP11B1 (11β-hydroxylase), CYP17A1 (17α-hydroxylase/17,20-lyase), and CYP21A2 (21-hydroxylase). It inhibits glucocorticoid biosynthesis and hence circulating levels of glucocorticoids, thereby treating Cushing's syndrome. In addition to its increased potency, the drug is 12-fold less potent than racemic ketoconazole in inhibiting CYP7A1 (cholesterol 7α-hydroxylase), theoretically resulting in further reduced interference with bile acid production and metabolite elimination and therefore less risk of hepatotoxicity. Levoketoconazole has also been found to inhibit CYP11A1 (cholesterol side-chain cleavage enzyme) and CYP51A1 (lanosterol-14α-demethylase), similarly but more potently relative to ketoconazole.

References

External links 
 
 
 

7α-Hydroxylase inhibitors
11β-Hydroxylase inhibitors
21-Hydroxylase inhibitors
Acetamides
Antiglucocorticoids
Chloroarenes
Cholesterol side-chain cleavage enzyme inhibitors
CYP3A4 inhibitors
CYP17A1 inhibitors
Dioxolanes
Enantiopure drugs
Lanosterol 14α-demethylase inhibitors
para-Methoxyphenylpiperazines
Phenylethanolamine ethers